This article contains a list of tobacco cultivars and varieties, as well as unique preparations of the tobacco leaf involving particular methods of processing the plant. (E.g. cavendish tobacco.)

Types

Aromatic Fire-cured 

Prior to the American Civil War, most tobacco grown in the US were fire-cured dark-leaf. This type of tobacco was planted in fertile lowlands, used a robust variety of leaf, and was either fire cured or air-cured. Aromatic fire-cured smoking tobacco is dark leaf, a robust variety of tobacco used as a condimental for pipe blends. It is cured by smoking over gentle fires. In the United States, it is grown in northern middle Tennessee, western Kentucky and in Virginia. Fire-cured tobacco grown in Kentucky and Tennessee is used in some chewing tobaccos, moist snuff, some cigarettes and as a condiment leaf in pipe tobacco blends. It has a rich, slightly floral taste, and adds body and aroma to the blend.

See also Latakia.

Brightleaf tobacco (Virginia tobacco) 

Sometime after the War of 1812, demand for a milder, lighter, more aromatic tobacco arose. Ohio, Pennsylvania and Maryland all innovated with milder varieties of the tobacco plant. Farmers around the country experimented with different curing processes. But the breakthrough did not come until around 1839.

Growers had noticed that sandy, highland soil produced thinner, weaker plants. Captain Abisha Slade, of Caswell County, North Carolina had considerable infertile, sandy soil, and planted the new "gold-leaf" varieties on it. Slade owned a slave, Stephen, who around 1839 accidentally produced the first true bright tobacco. He used charcoal to restart a fire used to cure the crop. The surge of heat turned the leaves yellow. Using that discovery, Slade developed a system for producing bright tobacco, cultivated on poorer soils and using charcoal for heat-curing.

Slade made many public appearances to share the bright-leaf process with other farmers. His success helped him build a brick house in Yanceyville, North Carolina, and at one time he had many slaves.

News spread through the area pretty quickly. The infertile sandy soil of the Appalachian piedmont was suddenly profitable, and people rapidly developed flue-curing techniques, a more efficient way of smoke-free curing. Farmers discovered that Bright leaf tobacco needs thin, starved soil, and those who could not grow other crops found that they could grow tobacco. Formerly unproductive farms reached 20–35 times their previous worth. By 1855, six Piedmont counties adjoining Virginia ruled the tobacco market.

By the outbreak of the Civil War, the town of Danville, Virginia had developed a bright-leaf market for the surrounding area in Caswell County, North Carolina and Pittsylvania County, Virginia.

Danville was also the main railway head for Confederate soldiers going to the front. These brought bright tobacco with them from Danville to the lines, traded it with each other and Union soldiers, and developed quite a taste for it. At the end of the war, the soldiers went home and a national market had developed for the local crop. Caswell and Pittsylvania counties were the only two counties in the South that increased in total wealth after the war.

Broadleaf
Broadleaf, a dark tobacco varietal family popular for producing enormous, resilient, and thick wrapper leaves.

Burley 

The origin of White Burley tobacco was credited to a Mr. George Webb in 1864, who grew it near Higginsport, Ohio, from seed from Bracken County, Kentucky. He noticed it yielded a different type of light leaf shaded from white to yellow, and cured differently. By 1866, he harvested 20,000 pounds of Burley tobacco and sold it in 1867 at the St. Louis Fair for $58 per hundred pounds. By 1883, the principal market for this tobacco was Cincinnati, but it was grown throughout central Kentucky and Middle Tennessee. In 1880 Kentucky produced 36 percent of the total national tobacco production, and was first in the country, with nearly twice as much tobacco produced as by Virginia, than the second-place state.

Burley tobacco is a light air-cured tobacco used primarily for cigarette production. In the United States, it is produced in an eight-state belt with approximately 70 percent produced in Kentucky. Tennessee produces approximately 20 percent, with smaller amounts produced in Indiana, North Carolina, Missouri, Ohio, Virginia and West Virginia. Burley tobacco is produced in many other countries, with major production in Brazil, Malawi and Argentina. In the U.S., burley tobacco plants are started from pelletized seeds placed in polystyrene trays floated on a bed of fertilized water in March or April.

Cavendish 

Cavendish is a process of curing and a method of cutting tobacco and is not a type of tobacco. The processing and the cut are used to bring out the natural sweet taste in the tobacco. Cavendish can be produced out of any tobacco type but is usually one of or a blend of; Kentucky, Virginia, and Burley and is most commonly used for pipe tobacco and cigars.

The process begins by pressing the tobacco leaves into a cake about an inch thick. The heat from fire or steam is applied, and the tobacco is allowed to ferment. This is said to result in sweet and mild tobacco. Finally, the cake is sliced. These slices must be broken apart, as by rubbing in a circular motion between one's palms before the tobacco can be evenly packed into a pipe. Flavoring is often added before the leaves are pressed. English Cavendish uses a dark flue or fire cured Virginia (DEC), which is steamed and then stored under pressure to permit it to cure and ferment for several days or weeks.

Corojo 

Corojo is a type of tobacco used primarily in the making of cigars, originally grown in the Vuelta Abajo region of Cuba.

Corojo was originally developed and grown by Diego Rodriguez at his farm or vega, Santa Ines del Corojo, and takes its name from the farm. It was used as a wrapper extensively for many years on Cuban cigars, but its susceptibility to various diseases, Blue mold in particular, caused the Cuban genetic engineers to develop various hybrid forms that would not only be disease-resistant but would also display excellent wrapper qualities.

Criollo 

Criollo is primarily used in the making of cigars. It was, by most accounts, one of the original Cuban tobaccos that emerged around the time of Columbus. The term means native seed, and thus a tobacco variety using the term, such as Dominican Criollo, may or may not have anything to do with the original Cuban seed nor the recent hybrid, Criollo '98.

Dokha 

Dokha is tobacco originally grown in UAE, Iran, and other gulf states. Traditional dokha is 100% additive-free tobacco. Dokha is Arabic for dizzy, which refers to the extremely high nicotine content of dokha. Dokha is not cured like many other commercial tobacco products and is minimally processed. The green leaves are dried and shredded into small flakes which are smoked through a pipe called a medwakh.

Ecuadorian Sumatra 

Mr. Jose Aray Marin, the founder of the Don Cervantes factory, developed the world-famous Ecuadorian Sumatra breed in 1967. It is now considered the world’s premium cigar wrapper leaf and is in demand by cigar manufacturers worldwide.

Habano 
Habano cigar wrapper is a leaf grown from a Cuban seed, hence the word “Habano” or “Havano,” referring to Cuba’s capital. Habano tobacco wrapper is darker in colour, has a much spicier flavor, a richer aroma, and has been grown in Nicaragua’s Jalapa Valley and Estelí since the 1990s.

Habano 2000 
Habano 2000 is a cross between El Corojo, the standard wrapper leaf from the Vuelta Abajo, the Cuban region that many believe produces the best cigar tobacco in the world, and a tobacco called Bell 61-10, a mild cigarette tobacco that is more resistant to blue mold than cigar tobacco. The Cubans first crossed El Corojo and Bell 61-10 tobacco to create something they called Habana 2.1.1. Then they took the new mixture and crossed it again with El Corojo, arriving at Habano 2000.

Latakia 

Another fire-cured tobacco is Latakia and is produced from oriental varieties of N. tabacum. The leaves are cured and smoked over smoldering fires of local hardwoods and aromatic shrubs in Cyprus and Syria. Latakia has a pronounced flavor and a very distinctive smoky aroma and is used in Balkan and English-style pipe tobacco blends.

Maduro 
Maduro is a process for bringing out the sweetness of a tobacco leaf. Maduro is a Spanish word meaning "ripe." Maduro wrappers come from fermenting tobacco in piles at higher temperatures and with more humidity than other tobacco types.

Oriental Tobacco 

Oriental tobacco is a sun-cured, highly aromatic, small-leafed variety (Nicotiana tabacum) that is grown in Turkey, Greece, Bulgaria, Lebanon, and North Macedonia. Oriental tobacco is frequently referred to as "Turkish tobacco," as these regions were all historically part of the Ottoman Empire. Many of the early brands of cigarettes were made mostly or entirely of Oriental tobacco (like Murad, Fatima...); today, its main use is in blends of pipe and especially cigarette tobacco (a typical American cigarette is a blend of bright Virginia, burley and Oriental).

Perique 

Perique comes from Saint James Parish, Louisiana (Paroisse de Saint-Jacques). When the Acadians made their way into this region in 1755, the Choctaw and Chickasaw tribes were cultivating a variety of tobacco with a distinctive flavor. A farmer called Pierre Chenet is credited with first turning this local tobacco into the Perique in 1824 through the technique of pressure-fermentation.

Considered the truffle of pipe tobaccos, the Perique is used as a component of many blended pipe tobaccos, but is too strong to be smoked pure. At one time, the freshly moist Perique was also chewed, but none is now sold for this purpose. It is traditionally a pipe tobacco and is still very popular with pipe-smokers, typically blended with pure Virginia to lend spice, strength, and coolness to the blend.

Shade tobacco 

It is not well known that the Northeastern US states of Connecticut and Massachusetts are also two of the most important tobacco-growing regions in the country. Long before Europeans arrived in the area, Native Americans cultivated tobacco along the banks of the Connecticut River. Today, the Connecticut River valley north of Hartford, Connecticut is known as "Tobacco Valley," and the fields and drying sheds are visible to travelers on the road to and from Bradley International Airport, the major Connecticut airport.

Connecticut shade tobacco is grown under tents to protect plant leaves from direct sunlight. This imitates the conditions of tobacco plants growing in the shade of trees in tropical areas. The result is leaves of lighter color and of a more delicate structure. They are used as outer wrappers for some of the world's finest cigars. It is not entirely clear who introduced this method of growing tobacco, but it is likely that the New York firm of Schroeder & Bon or its founder Frederick A. Schroeder was instrumental in developing this agricultural innovation.

Early Connecticut colonists acquired from the Native Americans the habit of smoking tobacco in pipes and began cultivating the plant commercially, even though the Puritans referred to it as the "evil weed." The plant was outlawed in Connecticut in 1650, but in the 19th century, as cigar smoking began to be popular, tobacco farming became a major industry, employing farmers, laborers, local youths, southern African Americans, and migrant workers.

Working conditions varied from backbreaking work for young local children, ages 13 and up, to backbreaking exploitation of migrants. Each tobacco plant yields only 18 leaves useful as cigar wrappers, and each leaf requires a great deal of individual manual attention during harvesting. The temperature in the curing sheds sometimes exceeds , and no work is done inside the sheds while the tobacco is being fired.

Connecticut tobacco production peaked in 1921, at  under cultivation. The rise of cigarette smoking and the decline of cigar smoking have caused a corresponding decline in the demand for shade tobacco, reaching a minimum in 1992 of  under cultivation. However, only  of shade tobacco were harvested in the Connecticut Valley in 2006. Connecticut seed is being grown in Ecuador, where labor is very cheap. The industry has weathered some major catastrophes, including a devastating hailstorm in 1929, and an epidemic of brown spot fungus in 2000, but is now in danger of disappearing altogether, given the value of the land to real estate speculators. The older and much less labor-intensive broad leaf plant, which produces an excellent Maduro wrapper as well as binder and filler for cigars, is increasing in the area in the Connecticut Valley.

Thuoc lao 

Thuoc lao is a type of tobacco derived from the nicotine-rich Nicotiana rustica, grown exclusively in Vietnam and is often smoked by Vietnamese rice farmers.

It is most commonly smoked after a meal on a full stomach to aid in digestion, or along with green tea or local beer (most commonly the cheap "bia hơi"). A "hit" of thuoc lao is followed by a flood of nicotine to the bloodstream inducing strong dizziness that last several seconds. Even heavy smokers have had trouble with the intense volume of smoke and the side effects include nausea and vomiting.

Type 22 

Type 22 tobacco is a classification of United States tobacco product as defined by the U. S. Department of Agriculture, effective date November 7, 1986. The definition states that type 22 tobacco is a type of dark fire-cured tobacco, known as Eastern District fire-cured, produced principally in a section east of the Tennessee River in southern Kentucky and northern Tennessee. Most type 22 tobacco in northern Tennessee is grown in Robertson and Montgomery counties in Middle Tennessee. Its principal use is in the manufacture of chewing tobacco.

White Burley 

White Burley, similar to Burley tobacco, is the main component in chewing tobacco, American blend pipe tobacco, and American-style cigarettes.

In 1865, George Webb of Brown County, Ohio planted Red Burley seeds he had purchased and found that a few of the seedlings had a whitish, sickly look. He transplanted them to the fields anyway, where they grew into mature plants but retained their light color. The cured leaves had an exceedingly fine texture and were exhibited as a curiosity at the market in Cincinnati. The following year he planted ten acres (40,000 m²) from seeds from those plants, which brought a premium at auction. The air-cured leaf was found to be mild tasting and more absorbent than any other variety. White Burley, as it was later called, became the main component in chewing tobacco, American blend pipe tobacco, and American-style cigarettes. The white part of the name is seldom used today, since red burley, a dark air-cured variety of the mid-19th century, no longer exists.

Wild tobacco 

Wild tobacco is native to the southwestern United States, Mexico, and parts of South America. Its botanical name is Nicotiana rustica. In Australia Nicotiana benthamiana and Nicotiana gossei are two of several indigenous tobaccos still used in some areas. Nicotiana rustica is the most potent strain of tobacco known. It is commonly used for tobacco dust or pesticides.

Y1 

Y1 is a strain of tobacco that was cross-bred by Brown & Williamson to obtain an unusually high nicotine content. It became controversial in the 1990s when the United States Food and Drug Administration (FDA) used it as evidence that tobacco companies were intentionally manipulating the nicotine content of cigarettes.

Y1 was developed by tobacco plant researcher James Chaplin, working under Dr. Jeffrey Wigand for Brown & Williamson (then a subsidiary of British American Tobacco) in the late 1970s. Chaplin, a director of the USDA Research Laboratory at Oxford, North Carolina, had described the need for a higher nicotine tobacco plant in the trade publication World Tobacco in 1977, and had bred a number of high-nicotine strains based on a hybrid of Nicotiana tabacum and Nicotiana rustica, but they were weak and would blow over in a strong wind. Only two grew to maturity; Y2, which "turned black in the drying barn and smelled like old socks," and Y1, which was a success.

B&W brought the plants to California company DNA Plant Technology for additional modification, including making the plants male-sterile, a procedure that prevents competitors from reproducing the strain from seeds. DNA Plant Technology then smuggled the seeds to a B&W subsidiary in Brazil.

Y1 has a higher nicotine content than conventional flue-cured tobacco (6.5% versus 3.2—3.5%), but a comparable amount of tar, and does not affect taste or aroma. British American Tobacco (BAT) began to discuss the trialling of Y1 tobacco in 1991, despite it not being approved for use in the United States. B&W promised in 1994 to stop using Y1, but at that time they had 7 million pounds of inventory, and continued to blend Y1 into their products until 1999.

References 

Tobacco